Meyer Rosen (November 17, 1919 – August 25, 2018) was an American politician from South Carolina. He served in the South Carolina House of Representatives from 1963 to 1966, representing Georgetown County, South Carolina. He was a lawyer.

References

1919 births
2018 deaths
Members of the South Carolina House of Representatives
People from Georgetown, South Carolina
South Carolina lawyers
20th-century American lawyers